The 3rd Connecticut Infantry Regiment was an infantry regiment that served in the Union Army during the American Civil War.

Service
The 3rd Connecticut Infantry Regiment was organized at New Haven, Connecticut and mustered in for three-months service on May 14, 1861, under the command of Colonel John L. Chatfield.

The regiment was attached to Mansfield's command, Department of Washington, to June 1861. Key's 1st Brigade, Tyler's 1st Division, McDowell's Army of Northeastern Virginia to August 1861.

The 3rd Connecticut Infantry mustered out of service on August 12, 1861.

Detailed service
Left Connecticut for Washington, D.C., May 19. Duty at Camp Corcoran, defenses of Washington, D.C., until June 1, 1861. Advanced to Vienna and Falls Church, Va., June 1–3, and picket duty there until July 16. Advanced to Manassas, Va., July 16–21. Occupation of Fairfax Court House July 17. Battle of Bull Run, Va., July 21.

Commanders
 Colonel John L. Chatfield

See also

 3rd Connecticut Regiment - Revolutionary War unit with this designation
 Connecticut in the American Civil War
 List of Connecticut Civil War units

References
 Dyer, Frederick H. A Compendium of the War of the Rebellion (Des Moines, IA:  Dyer Pub. Co.), 1908.
 McGregor, Jeremiah S. & James G. Vose. Life and Deeds of Dr. John McGregor (Foster, RI: Press of Fry Bros.), 1886.
 Shaw, William H.  A Diary as Kept by Wm. H. Shaw, During the Great Civil War, from April, 1861 to July, 1865 (S.l.:  s.n.), 1913.
 Tyler, Elnathan B. "Wooden Nutmegs" at Bull Run: A Humorous Account of Some of the Exploits and Experiences of the Three Months Connecticut Brigade, and the Part They Bore in the National Stampede (Hartford, CT:  G. L. Coburn), 1872.
Attribution
 

Military units and formations established in 1861
Military units and formations disestablished in 1861
3rd Connecticut Infantry Regiment